The following is a list of the largest European financial services companies, ordered by revenue in millions of US dollars.

European financial services companies by revenue

See also 
List of largest European companies by revenue
List of largest European manufacturing companies by revenue
List of largest companies by revenue
List of largest employers
List of largest corporate profits and losses
List of public corporations by market capitalization
Fortune Global 500
 List of wealthiest organizations

References

 CNN Money - Fortune Global 500

Lists of companies by revenue
Financial services companies by revenue